Joshua William Berry (born October 22, 1990) is an American professional stock car racing driver. He competes full-time in the NASCAR Xfinity Series, driving the No. 8 Chevrolet Camaro for JR Motorsports and part-time in the NASCAR Cup Series, driving the No. 9 Chevrolet Camaro ZL1 for Hendrick Motorsports as a relief driver for Chase Elliott. Berry has also competed for JRM in late model racing in both the NASCAR Advance Auto Parts Weekly Series (in which he won its 2020 national championship) and the CARS Tour, and also works as a driver coach for the team.

Racing career

Early career and late model racing

Berry met his future car owner Dale Earnhardt Jr. in 2008 when competing in an online sim racing league called DMP Online Racing. At the time, he was Legends car racing at his home track of Fairgrounds Speedway in Nashville while also attending Volunteer State Community College and working as a bank teller to fund his racing career. Earnhardt Jr. then signed Berry to his JR Motorsports team in 2010 to compete in late model racing.

At the 2015 Denny Hamlin Short Track Showdown, Berry spun Lee Pulliam while racing him and Timothy Peters for the lead on the final lap; Berry was moved down to 17th in the running order and drew criticism from Pulliam, who called Berry "the biggest joke in racing." After being spun by Bobby McCarty in CARS Tour at Motor Mile Speedway in 2019 and Ace Speedway in 2020, both times when Berry was leading the race, Berry intentionally wrecked McCarty later in the Ace Speedway race, resulting in a one-race suspension. Berry ditched a planned CARS schedule and instead focused on the NASCAR Advance Auto Parts Weekly Series, winning 24 races en route to a national championship.

NASCAR and ARCA

2014–2020
Berry's first NASCAR Xfinity Series race came at Iowa Speedway, driving the No. 5 Chevrolet Camaro for JR Motorsports. He started tenth and finished twelfth, finishing on the lead lap. He returned to the 5 car for the season finale at Homestead-Miami Speedway, again logging a lead-lap finish in 25th. He finished his debut season 50th in points. He returned to JR Motorsports for one race in 2015, finishing seventh at Richmond International Raceway. In 2016, his first race of the season was at Iowa, where he finished ninth in the No. 88 for JR Motorsports. He returned to that car in the first race of the Xfinity Series Chase, at Kentucky Speedway and ended up finishing 13th. Berry also made one start for Obaika Racing, finishing 27th at Darlington Raceway. Berry also debuted in the NASCAR Camping World Truck Series during the 2016 season, driving the No. 71 Contreras Motorsports truck to a 13th-place finish at Chicagoland Speedway.

In 2017, Berry made his first Xfinity Series start of the season, attempting the Kansas race for newly-formed NextGen Motorsports, driving their No. 55 Toyota. After qualifying 33rd, he finished 34th after suffering an engine failure on lap 182.

In 2018, Berry made his debut in the ARCA Racing Series, driving for Chad Bryant Racing in their No. 22 Ford at Salem Speedway in April of that year, finishing 4th. In 2019, he drove for Visconti Motorsports and finished 3rd in their No. 74 car in the NASCAR K&N Pro Series East race at New Hampshire in September, which was his first start in that series. These were his only starts in NASCAR or ARCA in both of these years.

2021

On October 22, 2020, JR Motorsports announced that it had scheduled Berry to drive its No. 8 car for 12 races in the 2021 NASCAR Xfinity Series season. At Phoenix Raceway, Berry was turned by Santino Ferrucci, prompting him to give Ferrucci double middle fingers as he drove by. He recorded his first Xfinity win at Martinsville upon passing Ty Gibbs for the lead with 28 laps remaining; Berry was the fifth driver to win his maiden race in the series at Martinsville alongside Sam Ard (1982), Brett Bodine (1985), Brad Teague (1987) and Jeff Burton (1990).

In March, Berry returned to the Truck Series for the first time since 2016. He substituted for Kris Wright in the No. 02 for Young's Motorsports after Wright tested positive for COVID-19.

In May, Berry made his NASCAR Cup Series debut in the Drydene 400 at Dover International Speedway, substituting for Justin Haley in the Spire Motorsports No. 77 car after Haley was sidelined by COVID-19 protocols, marking the second time that Berry was called on to fill in for a driver that had to miss a race because of COVID-19. He also drove in his second ARCA Menards Series East (formerly NASCAR K&N Pro Series East) race that weekend in the No. 41 for Cook-Finley Racing, which meant that he did triple duty that weekend at Dover. On May 26, it was announced that Berry would get to compete in the Xfinity Series race at Mid-Ohio road course in the No. 31 for Jordan Anderson Racing. Miguel Paludo was driving Berry's normal car, the No. 8 for JR Motorsports, in this race.

Another Truck return came in June in the No. 25 of Rackley WAR for three races at Texas, Nashville, and Pocono after the departure of Timothy Peters. A month later, he rejoined JRM for the Xfinity race at Loudon in the No. 1 after Michael Annett suffered a leg injury.

On August 16, Berry was confirmed to drive the No. 8 for JR Motorsports full time in 2022. Later in the week, he filled in for Spire's other Cup driver Corey LaJoie at Michigan when LaJoie was not allowed to compete due to COVID-19 protocols. When Annett was re-injured in September, Berry once again took over as replacement at Bristol and Las Vegas, and he won the latter after passing teammate Justin Allgaier with under 20 laps to go.

2022
Berry began the 2022 season with a 16th place finish at Daytona. He scored wins at Dover and Charlotte to make the playoffs. During the playoffs, Berry won at Las Vegas to make the Championship 4.

2023
Berry's season began with a 26th place finish at Daytona. On March 3, it was announced that Berry would run the Cup Series race at Las Vegas after Chase Elliott sustained a leg injury from snowboarding in Colorado. Berry finished 10th the following week in the Cup Series race at Phoenix, and is expected to fill in for the oval races until Elliott recovers.

Personal life
Berry worked as a bank teller before his racing career provided a steady income. He is a graduate of Volunteer State Community College. Berry is a former classmate of IndyCar champion Josef Newgarden in the 7th and 8th grades.

Motorsports career results

NASCAR
(key) (Bold – Pole position awarded by qualifying time. Italics – Pole position earned by points standings or practice time. * – Most laps led.)

Cup Series

Xfinity Series

Camping World Truck Series

 Season still in progress
 Ineligible for series points

ARCA Menards Series
(key) (Bold – Pole position awarded by qualifying time. Italics – Pole position earned by points standings or practice time. * – Most laps led.)

ARCA Menards Series East

ARCA Menards Series West

References

External links
 
 
 

Living people
1990 births
Racing drivers from Nashville, Tennessee
Racing drivers from Tennessee
NASCAR drivers
ARCA Menards Series drivers
JR Motorsports drivers